Aloïse Blanche Corbaz (28 June 1886 – 5 April 1964) was a Swiss outsider artist included in Jean Dubuffet's initial collection of psychiatric art. She is one of very few acclaimed female outsider artists.

Life
Aloïse Blanche Corbaz was born in Lausanne, Switzerland in 1886.  She earned her baccalauréat in 1906. Although she dreamt of becoming a singer, Aloïse worked as a dressmaker until leaving for Germany in 1911.  She eventually found work as a teacher and a governess, in Potsdam, at the court of German Kaiser Wilhelm II. While there, she developed an obsessive romantic passion for the Kaiser. The start of World War I necessitated Aloïse's return to Switzerland.  Her imaginary romance with the Kaiser continued, leading to her being diagnosed with schizophrenia and committed to  the asylum at Cery-sur-Lausanne in 1918. In 1920 she was moved to an annex of the hospital, la Rosiere a Gimel, where she remained until her death in 1964.

Work
She started drawing and writing poetry in secret , but most of her early work has been destroyed. Director of the hospital Hans Steck and general practitioner Jacqueline Porret-Forel first took an interest in her work in 1936, and it was finally discovered by Dubuffet in 1947. He believed Aloïse cured herself by ceasing to fight against her illness, by choosing to cultivate it and make use of it instead.

Her work is erotic, consisting primarily of beautiful women with voluptuous curves and flowing hair attended by lovers in military uniform. She used the vivid colors of crayons, pencils, and flower juice to fill entire sheets of paper. Her compulsion to make marks on every inch of paper is a "horror vacui" remarkably similar to that of Adolf Wölfli.

Collections and exhibits

In 2012 the Collection de l'Art Brut and the Musée cantonal des Beaux-Arts de Lausanne presented a solo exhibition of Aloïse Corbaz's work titled Aloïse. Le Ricochet Solaire.

References

External links
Aloïse & the Theater of the Universe
Aloïse in the Art Brut Collection

Further reading
 http://www.rawvision.com/articles/art-aloise-lone-continent

1886 births
1964 deaths
Outsider artists
People from Lausanne
People with schizophrenia
Swiss women artists
Women outsider artists
20th-century Swiss artists